Pascual Marquina Narro (16 May 1873 – 13 July 1948) was a prolific Spanish orchestral and operatic composer, known particularly for his pasodoble works, such as España cañí.

References

1873 births
1948 deaths
Male opera composers
People from Calatayud
Spanish classical composers
Spanish male classical composers
Spanish opera composers